Llanychan is a parish near Llandyrnog, Denbighshire, Wales. Covering , it is the smallest parish in the diocese of St Asaph. It is approximately three miles northeast of Ruthin.

There are only two churches in Wales consecrated to Sant Hychan, and Llanychan Church, after which the parish is named, is one of them. It is mentioned in the Norwich Tax Records in 1254. Its notable features include a window dating from 1626, a reading desk from 1730, and a reredos from 1846. The church was extensively restored in 1878.

There was a school in the parish until the beginning of the 20th century.

See also
 Rhydellteyrn
 Fermdy Rhydonnen ancient farmhouse

References

Villages in Denbighshire